The Romanian War of Independence is the name used in Romanian historiography to refer to the Russo-Turkish War (1877–78), following which Romania, fighting on the Russian side, gained independence from the Ottoman Empire. On , Romania and the Russian Empire signed a treaty at Bucharest under which Russian troops were allowed to pass through Romanian territory, with the condition that Russia respected the integrity of Romania. Consequently, the mobilization of the Romanian troops also began, and about 120,000 soldiers were massed in the south of the country to defend against an eventual attack of the Ottoman forces from south of the Danube. On , Russia declared war on the Ottoman Empire and its troops entered Romania through the newly built Eiffel Bridge, on their way to the Ottoman Empire. Due to great losses, the Russian Empire asked Romania to intervene. On , the first Romanian Army units crossed the Danube and joined forces with the Russian Army.

Romanian proclamation of independence

On , in the Romanian parliament, Mihail Kogălniceanu read the act of independence of Romania as the will of the Romanian people. After the Declaration, the Romanian government immediately cancelled paying tribute to the Ottoman Empire (914,000 lei), and the sum was given instead to the Romanian War Ministry.

Initially, before 1877, Russia did not wish to cooperate with Romania, since they did not wish Romania to participate in the peace treaties after the war, but the Russians encountered a very strong Ottoman army of 40,000 soldiers, led by Osman Pasha, at the Siege of Plevna (Pleven) where the Russian troops, led by Russian generals, suffered very heavy losses and were routed in several battles.

Conflict

Due to great losses, Grand Duke Nikolai Nikolaevich, the Russian commander-in-chief, asked Prince Carol I for the Romanian Army to intervene and join forces with the Russian Army.

Prince Carol I accepted the Duke's proposal to become the Marshal of the Russian troops in addition to the command of his own Romanian army, thus being able to lead the combined armed forces to the conquest of Plevna and the formal surrender, after heavy fighting, of the Turkish General Osman Pasha. The Army won the battles of Grivitsa and Rahova, and on 28 November 1877 the Plevna citadel capitulated, and Osman Pasha surrendered the city, the garrison and his sword to the Romanian colonel Mihail Cerchez and Russian division commander Ivan Ganetsky. After the occupation of Plevna, the Romanian Army returned to the Danube and won the battles of Vidin and Smârdan.

On 19 January 1878, the Ottoman Empire requested an armistice, which was accepted by Russia and Romania. Romania won the war but at a cost of more than 19,000 casualties. Its independence from the Porte was finally recognized on 13 July 1878.

Naval operations

The Romanian Navy consisted of three gunboats: Ştefan cel Mare, România and Fulgerul and one spar torpedo boat, Rândunica. The three gunboats displaced 352, 130 and 85 tons respectively. Ştefan cel Mare and România were each armed with four guns and Fulgerul with one gun. Despite its inferiority on paper, the Romanian Navy destroyed many Turkish river gunboats.

According to the Russian-Romanian treaty signed in April that year, the Romanian spar torpedo boat Rândunica served under joint Romanian-Russian command. She was also known as Tsarevich by the Russians. Her crew consisted of two Russian Lieutenants, Dubasov and Shestakov, and three Romanians: Major Murgescu (the official liaison officer with the Russian headquarters), an engine mechanic and a navigator. The attack of Rândunica took place during the night of 25–26 May 1877, near Măcin. As she was approaching the Ottoman monitor Seyfi, the latter fired three rounds at her without any effect. Before she could fire the fourth round, Rândunica'''s spar struck her between the midships and the stern. A powerful explosion followed, with debris from the Ottoman warship raising up to 40 meters in the air. The half-sunk monitor then re-opened fire, but was struck once again, with the same devastating effects. The crew of Seyfi subsequently fired their rifles at Rândunica, as the latter was retreating and their monitor was sinking. Following this action, Ottoman warships throughout the remainder of the war would always retreat upon sighting spar torpedo boats. The Russian Lieutenants Dubasov and Shestakov were decorated with the Order of St. George, while Major Murgescu was decorated with the Order of Saint Vladimir as well as the Order of the Star of Romania. Rândunica was returned to full Romanian control in 1878, after the Russian ground forces had finished crossing the Danube.Cristian Crăciunoiu, Romanian navy torpedo boats, Modelism, 2003, pp. 13-18 The Ottoman monitor Seyfi was a 400-ton ironclad warship, with a maximum armor thickness of 76 mm and armed with two 120 mm guns.

Another Ottoman monitor, the Podgoriçe, was shelled and sunk by Romanian coastal artillery on 7 November 1877.

Aftermath
The peace treaty between Russia and the Ottoman Empire was signed at San Stefano, on 3 March 1878. It created a Bulgarian principality and recognized the independence of Serbia, Montenegro, and Romania.

The Convention between Russia and Romania, which established the transit of Russian troops through the country, is one by which Russia obliged itself "to maintain and have the political rights of Romanian state observed, such as they result from the internal laws and the existent tratatives and also to defend the present integrity of Romania". The Romanians believe that "defend" in a diplomatic act means recognition of the status-quo set by Congress of Paris of 1856, whereby three counties in Southern Bessarabia (part of Budjak, a region conquered by Turks around the late 15th century and ruled until the late 19th century when it was conquered by Russians) were taken from the Russian Empire, defeated in the Crimean War, and given back to the Romanians in Principality of Moldavia. The Russian Empire never wanted to "maintain and defend" the integrity of Romanian Principality.  They wanted to conquer as much as possible from the sick man of Europe, the Black Sea region (control of Danube) all the way to Constantinopole (Dardanelles/Bosphorus) and the Mediterranean Sea.

The treaty was not recognised by the Central Powers and the 1878 peace conference in Berlin decided that Russia would give Romania its independence, the territories of Northern Dobruja, the Danube Delta and access to the Black Sea including the ancient port of Tomis, as well as the tiny Snake Island, but Russia would nevertheless occupy as a so-called "compensation" the old Romanian counties of Southern Bessarabia (Cahul, Bolgrad and Ismail), which by the Treaty of Paris of 1856 (after the Crimean War) were included in Moldavia. Prince Carol was most unhappy by this unfavorable turn of negotiations; he was finally persuaded by Bismarck (in now-published original letters exchanged at that time) to accept this compromise with Russia in view of the great economical potential of Romania's direct access to the Black Sea and its ancient ports at the expense of Bulgaria.

See also
 Kingdom of Romania
 Great Eastern Crisis

Footnotes

External links

 The Plevna Delay by Richard T. Trenk Sr. (Originally published in Man At Arms'' magazine, Number Four, August, 1997)
 The Romanian Army of the Russo-Turkish War 1877–78
 Grivitsa Romanian Mausoleum in Bulgaria
 

Rebellions in Romania
Conflicts in 1877
Conflicts in 1878
Wars involving Romania
Wars of independence
Wars involving the Ottoman Empire
1877 in the Ottoman Empire
1878 in the Ottoman Empire
Rebellions against the Ottoman Empire
Articles containing video clips
Independence
1870s in Romania